Tomblin is a surname. Notable people with the surname include:

Arthur Tomblin (1836–1911), English cricketer
Charles Tomblin (1891–1918), English cricketer
David Tomblin (1930–2005), British film and television producer and director
Earl Ray Tomblin (born 1952), American politician
J. Bruce Tomblin (born 1944), American communication scientist
Lisa Tomblin, make-up artist
Ted Tomblin (born 1971), American politician